The Corinth School District is a public school district based in Corinth, Mississippi (USA).

Schools
SAE Institute of Technology  Atlanta |College]] (Diploma)
The Los Angeles Film School (Associates)
Old Dominion University  (Bachelors)

Demographics

2006-07 school year
There were a total of 1,947 students enrolled in the Corinth School District during the 2006–2007 school year. The gender makeup of the district was 48% female and 52% male. The racial makeup of the district was 40.01% African American, 55.47% White, 3.75% Hispanic, 0.56% Asian, and 0.21% Native American. 47.1% of the district's students were eligible to receive free lunch.

Previous school years

Accountability statistics

See also
List of school districts in Mississippi

References

External links
Corinth School District

Education in Alcorn County, Mississippi
School districts in Mississippi
Corinth, Mississippi